Toyah may refer to:

Toyah Willcox, a singer, actress, and TV presenter, often referred to by her first name only
Toyah (band), the pop group fronted by Toyah Willcox between 1977 and 1983
Toyah, Texas, a town in Texas, USA
Toyah Battersby, a character in Coronation Street

See also
Toya (disambiguation)